The RPI–WPI football rivalry is an American college football rivalry between the RPI Engineers of Rensselaer Polytechnic Institute and the WPI Engineers of Worcester Polytechnic Institute. The two teams have played regularly since their first meeting in 1894, making it one of the oldest rivalries in college football history. The series was played uninterrupted from 1947 until 2020, when it was interrupted by the COVID-19 pandemic. Following the teams' 1979 meeting, the schools agreed to award a transit to the winning team; having become a tradition since 1980.

Game results

See also  
 List of NCAA college football rivalry games

References

College football rivalries in the United States
RPI Engineers football
WPI Engineers football
1894 establishments in Massachusetts
1894 establishments in New York (state)
Recurring sporting events established in 1894